The Liard River of the North American boreal forest flows through Yukon, British Columbia and the Northwest Territories, Canada.

Geography
The river habitats are a subsection of the Lower Mackenzie Freshwater Ecoregion. The area around the river in Yukon is called the Liard River Valley, and the Alaska Highway follows the river for part of its route. This surrounding area is also referred to as the Liard Plain, and is a physiographic section of the larger Yukon–Tanana Uplands province, which in turn is part of the larger Intermontane Plateaus physiographic division.

The Liard River is a crossing area for Nahanni wood bison.

History
The Indigenous name for the river is Nêtʼił Tué', which means Hanging Down River in the Kaska language. The name comes from a particularly narrow spot near the river's headwaters, where Kaska people used to set goat snares. The "hanging down" - "Nêtʼił" part of the name refers to the snares. The origin of the river's name in mainstream use today is obscure, but is derived from the French word for "Eastern Cottonwood" (a kind of poplar) which grow in abundance along sections of the river. Among the early fur traders, who traveled the river corridor the Liard above the Fort Nelson River was referred to as the "West Branch," while the Fort Nelson River was the "East Branch."

The first European to traverse most of the river was John McLeod of the Hudson's Bay Company (HBC).  Leaving Fort Simpson on June 28, 1831, McLeod and eight others ascended the river, reaching and naming the Dease River in just over six weeks.  Four days later, they reached the Frances River, and mistakenly ascended it, thinking it was the Liard's main branch.  Nine years later, another HBC employee, Robert Campbell, journeyed to the source of the Liard in the St. Cyr Range, renaming the river McLeod had ascended for Frances Ramsay Simpson, the wife of the Sir George Simpson, the HBC's governor who had authorised both expeditions.

The entire Yukon and British Columbia's portion of the river corridor is said to be the traditional unceded territory of the Kaska Dena, who have lived in the area for thousands of years and claim it as their rightful home. This claim is contested by both the Acho Dene Koe First Nation and Fort Nelson First Nation who count among their memberships the former residents of communities along the Liard, east of the Grand Canyon of the Liard, like Nelson Forks, La Jolie Butte, and Francois, where the Acho Dene Koe signed Treaty 11. Their descendants still live and hunt in the area to this day. Despite Kaska Dene claims, much of the area has been recognized as Fort Nelson and Acho Dene Koe First Nation territory under Treaty 8 and 11 since 1910 and 1922 respectively.

Features
 The Grand Canyon of the Liard is a  stretch of the river beginning just east of Liard River Hotsprings.  It contains numerous class IV and higher rapids.  It is located between the Toad and Trout Rivers' confluences with the Liard.   The area was the site of extensive study in the late 1970s and early 1980s by BC Hydro for a potential hydroelectric dam. The location, initially known as Site E, later renamed to Devil’s Gorge, was intended as one of a number of potential sister projects to the Site C Dam on the  Peace River. Though questions of feasibility and British Columbia’s future electricity needs would lead to the project, along with British Columbia’s other Site projects, being shelved in favour of Site C.
 The Liard Canyon is a separate canyon from the Grand Canyon, and is located near Lower Post.  
 Liard River Hot Springs is a popular tourist attraction located at kilometre 765 of the Alaska Highway.
 The historic Liard River Suspension Bridge, built in 1944, is located at kilometre 798 of the Alaska Highway.

Course

Yukon

It flows south and east, between the ranges of Pelly Mountains, then south through the Yukon Plateau, where it receives the waters of Prospect Creek. It turns east after it receives the waters of the Caribou Creek from Caribou Lakes, then the Swede and Junkers Creek. It then follows the southern rim of the St. Cyr Range of the Pelly Mountains, where the Ings River flows into it. It follows the southern edge of the Simpson Range, receiving the waters of the Old Gold Creek, Rainbow Creek, Dome Creek, Quartz Creek and Scurvy Creek. The Liard River continues south-east, north of the Cassiar Mountains, from where it receives the Sayyea Creek and Cabin Creek while the Eckman Creek, Black River and Hasselberg Creek flow in from the north. It continues in a south-east direction, receiving the Sambo Creek, False Pass Creek, Meister River, Frances River, Rancheria River, Tom Creek, Watson Creek and Albert Creek before it flows through Upper Liard, west of Watson Lake, where it is crossed by the Alaska Highway. It receives the waters of Cormier Creek, then flows through the Liard Canyon and into British Columbia.

British Columbia

It flows south-east and east along the Alaska Highway, receiving the waters of Dease River, Kloye Creek, Trepanier Creek and Black Angus Creek. It continues east through the Dease Forest, where it receives the waters of the Hyland River south of Hyland River Provincial Park, then receives the Malcolm Creek, Tatisno Creek and Nustlo Creek. It flows along the Yukon border, where the Alaska Highway once again follows the Liard and receives the Cosh Creek, Contact Creek, Scoby Creek and Sandin Brook, then turns south around Mount Sandin, receiving water from Tsia Creek, Tsinitla Creek, Tatzille Creek and Leguil Creek. It turns eastwards along the northern margin of the Liard Plateau, where it receives the Kechika River near Skooks Landing, Niloil Creek from Niloil Lake and Coal River by Coal River. It continues east and south-east, south of Mount Reid, still followed by the Alaska Highway, receiving the waters of Geddes Creek, Grant Creek, Smith River, Lapie Creek, Teeter Creek, Mould Creek and Hoole Creek.

It enters the Liard River Hot Springs Provincial Park, where the Trout River empties into the Liard. Alaska Highway runs south along the Trout River, while the Liard flows east through the Liard River Corridor Provincial Park and Protected Area, south of the Sentinel Range of the Muskwa Ranges, receiving the waters of Deer River and Canyon Creek in the Grand Canyon of the Liard. It continues south-east between the Barricade Range and Mount Rothenberg of the Sentinel Range, where the Moule Creek and Sulphur Creek flow in the Liard. It flows east, out of the Northern Rockies and through the foothills, where it receives waters from the Brimstone Creek, Crusty Creek, Grayling River, Graybank Creek and Toad River. It turns north-west, receiving the waters from Garbutt Creek, Lepine Creek, Chimney Creek, Ruthie Creek, Scatter River and Beaver River.  It then turns south-east, receives the waters from Catkin Creek, Dunedin River and Fort Nelson River. From here it turns north, receiving the waters of Zus Creek, Sandy Creek and La Biche River and crosses into the Northwest Territories, immediately east of the Yukon border.

Northwest Territories

The Liard River continues north, receiving the waters of Big Island Creek, Kotaneelee River and Petitot River. It turns around Mount Coty of the Franklin Mountains near Fort Liard Airfield, where it meets the Liard Highway. It receives the waters of the Muskeg River, Rabbit Creek and Flett Creek as it flows east of the Liard Range and Mount Flett. The Liard meanders east of the Sawmill Mountain and receives waters from the Beaver Water Creek, Netla River and Bay Creek. After receiving the waters of South Nahanni River south of Nahanni Butte and east of the Nahanni National Park Reserve, the Liard turns east and north-east, receiving waters from Grainger River, Blackstone River, Dehdjida Creek, Matou River, Birch River and Poplar River. The Truesdell Island and Franklin-Clarke Island are formed at the river mouth.

Tributaries
From headwater to mouth, the tributaries of the Liard are:

Yukon
Prospect Creek
Swede Creek
Junkers Creek
Ings River
Old Gold Creek
Rainbow Creek
Dome Creek
Quartz Creek
Scurvy Creek
Sayyea Creek
Eckman Creek
Black River
Hasselberg Creek
Sambo Creek
Meister River
Frances River
Rancheria River
Tom Creek
Watson Creek
Albert Creek
Cormier Creek

British Columbia mountains
Dease River
Kloye Creek
Trepanier Creek
Black Angus Creek
Hyland River
Malcolm Creek
Tatisno Creek
Nustlo Creek
Cosh Creek
Contact Creek
Scoby Creek
Sandin Brook
Tsia Creek
Tsinitla Creek
Tatzille Creek
Leguil Creek
Kechika River
Niloil Creek
Coal River
Geddes Creek
Grant Creek
Smith River
Lapie Creek
Mould Creek
Hoole Creek
Trout River
Deer River
Canyon Creek
Moule Creek
Sulphur Creek

British Columbia foothills and plains
Brimstone Creek
Crusty Creek
Grayling River
Graybank Creek
Toad River
Garbutt Creek
Lepine Creek
Chimney Creek
Ruthie Creek
Scatter River
Beaver River
Catkin Creek
Dunedin River
Fort Nelson River
Zus Creek
Sandy Creek
La Biche River
Northwest Territories
Big Island Creek
Kotaneelee River
Petitot River
Muskeg River
Rabbit Creek
Flett Creek
Beaver Water Creek
Netla River
Bay Creek
South Nahanni River
Grainger River
Blackstone River
Dehdjida Creek
Matou River
Birch River
Poplar River
Manners Creek

Communities
From mouth to headwater, communities along the river include:
Fort Simpson
Fort Liard
Lower Post, British Columbia
Watson Lake, Yukon
Upper Liard, Yukon

See also
List of longest rivers of Canada
List of rivers of the Northwest Territories
List of rivers of Yukon

References

External links
 Map and photos

 
Liard Country
Rivers of British Columbia
Rivers of the Northwest Territories
Rivers of Yukon
Canyons and gorges of British Columbia
Tributaries of the Mackenzie River